The Noble Experiment is a distillery founded and operated by Bridget Firtle in Bushwick, New York City. It is NYC's only rum distillery, and is only available within the state.

Firtle began working on the company in 2011 while she was working on Wall Street managing a hedge fund. She left her job and began building The Noble Experiment in 2012, starting to sell white rum at the beginning of 2013. The product is named Owney's NYC Rum, after Prohibition-era bootlegger Owney Madden, and the company's name is taken after the nickname for the Prohibition policy. The rum is made solely from molasses, yeast, and NYC water.

Firtle has been featured on the Forbes Food & Wine 30 Under 30.

Amy Zavatto of Serious Eats described Owney's rum as "gently earthy" with a "mild, balanced, tender sweetness". Wine Enthusiast Magazine described it as crisp and appealing. It received a score of 93 at an Ultimate Spirits Challenge tasting.

References

External links 
 owneys.com

Distilleries in New York (state)
Companies based in Brooklyn
American companies established in 2012
Food and drink companies established in 2012
Food production companies based in New York City
Microdistilleries